Hans Eisenhut (21 December 1897 – ?) was a Swiss bobsledder who competed in the early 1930s. He finished fourth in the four-man event at the 1932 Winter Olympics in Lake Placid, New York.

References

1897 births
Year of death missing
Swiss male bobsledders
Olympic bobsledders of Switzerland
Bobsledders at the 1932 Winter Olympics
20th-century Swiss people